Assassin's Bullet (also known as Sofia) is a 2012 action drama thriller film directed by Isaac Florentine and starring Christian Slater, Donald Sutherland and Elika Portnoy, who is also credited for the story. The film was released directed to video.

Premise
When a vigilante decides to murder one by one the most wanted terrorists in the world, the FBI decides to send an agent to discover the identity of this person.

Cast
Christian Slater as Robert Diggs
Donald Sutherland as Ambassador Ashdown
Elika Portnoy as Victoria Denev
Timothy Spall as Dr. Khan
Valentin Ganev as Mikhail Denev
Bashar Rahal as Abdullah Said
Marian Valev as Gregor Spasov

Reception
The film received negative reviews and has a 7% rating on Rotten Tomatoes based on 15 reviews, with an average rating of 2.3/10.

Alison Willmore of The A.V. Club called the film as an "amusingly awful thriller" and Drew Taylor of IndieWire called it "a bad movie with incredibly clumsy narrative mechanics."

Frank Scheck of The Hollywood Reporter wrote, "The action sequences are strictly pro forma and -- despite the sleek killer’s resemblance to the similarly lethal heroine of La Femme Nikita -- this dull effort lacks the excitement generated by any of its incarnations."

Lisa Schwarzbaum of Entertainment Weekly gave the film a C.

References

External links
 
 

2012 films
2012 action thriller films
American direct-to-video films
American thriller drama films
American action thriller films
2010s English-language films
Films directed by Isaac Florentine
2010s American films